Timberline Church is a Pentecostal megachurch located in Fort Collins, Colorado, that is affiliated with the Assemblies of God USA.

Churches in Colorado
Evangelical megachurches in the United States
Megachurches in Colorado